Harry Erich Merkel (10 January 1918 – 11 February 1995) was a German racing driver. His single entry to a World Championship Grand Prix was at the 1952 German Grand Prix, sharing one of Willi Krakau's cars, a BMW-Eigenbau. He did not qualify, failing to set a time.

Complete Formula One World Championship results
(key)

References

German racing drivers
German Formula One drivers
1918 births
1995 deaths
German expatriate sportspeople in Australia
Racing drivers from Saxony